Florida Trend is a media company delivering business news and information across print and digital platforms. Florida Trend reports on all industry sectors, including health care, education, research and technology, finance, law, transportation and real estate. The media company regularly hosts community and industry portrait events with business and community leaders, shining a spotlight on growth in regional economies across the state. David G. Denor is Florida Trend’s publisher.

Florida Trend'''s monthly business magazine is read by more than 260,600 influential business, civil and governmental leaders and its companion website, FloridaTrend.com garners nearly 130,000 unique visitors each month. Its daily late-breaking business eNews alerts and weekly industry targeted eNewsletters are delivered to over 119,000 engaged and loyal opt-in e-news subscribers. Each month, Florida Trend delivers more than 3.4 million eNews alerts to its digital opt-in subscriber audience. 

In addition to the 12 monthly issues, Florida Trend produces specialty annuals such as Florida 500, reporting on the state's most influential business leaders across major industries; Business Florida, for the state's economic development interests; Florida Small Business, to help individuals start and grow companies; Legal Elite, highlighting the top attorneys in Florida; the Florida Education Guide and Florida Trend's NEXT,'' providing education and career guidance to high school guidance counselors/administrators and high school students.

Founded in 1958, Florida Trend was the nation's first regional business magazine. Subscribers are 84% executives, managers, owners, and professionals. A total of 86% of readers are between the age of 25-64 and 83% of readers are between the age of 35-64. The average reader has an income of $292,000, and a net household worth of $2.54 million.

Florida Trend is a member of Circulation Verification Council — among whose prominent members are Crain Communications Inc. and Hawaii Business Magazine — and Florida Magazine Association.

Article content
In addition to regional business news coverage, editorial assessment and analysis of economic, lifestyle and environmental trends, Florida Trend offers statewide rankings and statistical information. The top-of-the-year annual "Economic Outlook," for instance, offers insights into Florida's population by age, income, projected population and growth-related statistics. Florida's 350 Biggest Companies, which publishes in July, ranks Florida's top public and private companies by revenue. In August, Florida Trend publishes an annual list of "Florida's Best Companies To Work For"—featuring "Best Companies" ranked by the results of a voluntary, anonymous survey administered to employees of small, medium and large companies in Florida.

Awards
Florida Trend has won numerous national and regional awards, including the Gerald Loeb award and the Society for Professional Journalists' Green Eyeshade awards for investigative reporting and commentary. In 2011, Florida Trend won two Green Eyeshade awards — first place for general news reporting for "Medical Makeover" and second place for investigative reporting about Florida's role in international adoptions. The Alliance of Area Business Publications (AABP) has honored Florida Trend several times. Florida Trend received eight AABP Editorial Excellence awards in 2011, nine in 2012, ten awards in 2013, seven awards in 2014, five awards in 2015, four in 2016, seven in 2018, and five in 2019. In 2019, the AABP national competition included 511 entries from 41 publications. Additionally, Florida Trend has received several honors from the Florida Magazine Association, including 2018 and 2019 wins in the 'Best Digital', 'Best Design', and 'Best Overall Writing' categories; and from the American Society of Business Publication Editors, who awarded the magazine with three national awards in 2018.

Operations and headquarters
Trend is based in St. Petersburg, Florida and has satellite news and advertising offices in other cities around Florida.  Trend is owned by the Times Publishing Company, which is also the parent of the Tampa Bay Times, Florida's largest newspaper.  The Times is, in turn, owned by the Poynter Institute, a school for journalists founded by Nelson Poynter.

References

External links

1958 establishments in Florida
Business magazines published in the United States
Local interest magazines published in the United States
Monthly magazines published in the United States
Magazines established in 1958
Magazines published in Florida
Times Publishing Company